AET may refer to:
 Aet (given name), an Estonian feminine given name
 Assistant English Teacher, also called an Assistant Language Teacher
 Actual Evapotranspiration, in climatology
 Academies Enterprise Trust, in the UK
 Administration for Technical Investigations (Administration des enquêtes techniques)
 AET (company), a shipping company formerly known as American Eagle Tankers
 "After extra time", in sports, the score after overtime has finished
 Affective Events Theory, a model developed by organizational behaviorists to identify how emotions and moods influence job performance and satisfaction
 All-electronic tolling
 American Educational Trust, a non-profit foundation
 Australian Eastern Time, a time zone in Australia
 Alpha-Ethyltryptamine, a psychoactive drug belonging to the tryptamine family
 Allakaket Airport in Alaska (IATA Code: AET)
 Application Entity Title, in the DICOM medical imaging standard
 S-(2-aminoethyl)isothiuronium bromide hydrobromide